Fee Fee Creek is a stream in St. Louis County in the U.S. state of Missouri.

Fee Fee Creek derives its name from Nicholas Beaugenou dit Fi-Fi, a pioneer citizen.

See also
List of rivers of Missouri

References

Rivers of St. Louis County, Missouri
Rivers of Missouri